Edward Wilson Very (October 26, 1847 – March 1, 1910) was an American naval officer who adopted and popularized a single-shot breech-loading snub-nosed flare gun that fired flares that bear his name (Very lights). During his naval career he captained a gunboat off the shores of Japan, held positions in engineering, naval ordnance, artillery and signal staff postings and saw diplomatic service with the U.S. Legation in Paris.

Early life and education
His was the first appointment ever issued from that territory. He entered the academy in February 1863. He was granted a leave of absence in June 1864 for active service during the Civil War. He was then transferred to the steamer , where he participated in the blockade of Wilmington, North Carolina. He returned to the academy that October to complete his studies, graduating on June 7, 1867.

Military career

He was promoted to lieutenant in September 1871. During his time in Europe, he witnessed Marshal MacMahon's march into Paris to quell the Paris Commune.

In February 1874, he was ordered to ordnance duty at the Washington Navy Yard. He served four months with the Panama Interoceanic Canal Survey from December 1874 until returning to the Ordnance Bureau in mid-April 1875. In June, he received orders to the Navy's Torpedo Station, where he eventually commanded the experimental battery there. Beginning in February 1878, he was in charge of naval ordnance matters placing him with top European military and armaments officials while in Paris until 1881.

After serving on the Naval Advisory Board from 1881 to 1883, Very was assigned to special duties abroad. He resigned from the U.S. Navy, effective April 30, 1885, and took positions at the Hotchkiss Company and later at the American Ordnance Company.

Personal life
Very married Margaret Freeman Zeilin, the daughter of Jacob Zeilin, the seventh Commandant of the Marine Corps. He died of pneumonia in 1910 in New York City.

Publications

References

1847 births
1910 deaths
United States Navy officers
United States Naval Academy alumni
Union Navy officers
Deaths from pneumonia in New York City
People from Belfast, Maine
Burials at Arlington National Cemetery